William Craig Cooper (December 18, 1832 – August 29, 1902) was a U.S. Representative from Ohio.

Born in Mount Vernon, Ohio, Cooper attended the public schools and Mount Vernon Academy.
He studied law.
He was admitted to the bar in 1852 and commenced practice in Mount Vernon, Ohio.
He served as prosecuting attorney of Knox County 1859-1863.
He served as mayor of Mount Vernon 1862-1864.  During the American Civil War, Cooper was colonel of the 142nd Ohio Infantry, a 100 days regiment.
He served as a member of the State house of representatives 1872-1874.
He served as judge advocate general of Ohio 1879-1884.
He served as member and president of the board of education of Mount Vernon.

Cooper was elected as a Republican to the Forty-ninth, Fiftieth, and Fifty-first Congresses (March 4, 1885 – March 3, 1891).
He was not a candidate for renomination in 1890.
He resumed the practice of law in Mount Vernon, Ohio, where he died on August 29, 1902.
He was interred in Mound View Cemetery.

Sources

1832 births
1902 deaths
People from Mount Vernon, Ohio
Mayors of places in Ohio
County district attorneys in Ohio
People of Ohio in the American Civil War
Ohio lawyers
Republican Party members of the Ohio House of Representatives
Union Army colonels
Republican Party members of the United States House of Representatives from Ohio
19th-century American politicians
Burials in Ohio